Chahar Mazara is a village in Shaheed Bhagat Singh Nagar district of Punjab State, India. The village is administrated by Sarpanch an elected representative of the village.

Demography 
As of 2011, Chahar Mazara has a total number of 103 houses and population of 552 of which 270 include are males while 282 are females according to the report published by Census India in 2011. The literacy rate of Chahar Mazara is 74.90%, lower than the state average of 75.84%. The population of children under the age of 6 years is 46 which is 8.33% of total population of Chahar Mazara, and child sex ratio is approximately 840 as compared to Punjab state average of 846.

Most of the people are from Schedule Caste which constitutes 35.33% of total population in Chahar Mazara. The town does not have any Schedule Tribe population so far.

As per the report published by Census India in 2011, 202 people were engaged in work activities out of the total population of Chahar Mazara which includes 170 males and 32 females. According to census survey report 2011, 69.31% workers describe their work as main work and 30.69% workers are involved in Marginal activity providing livelihood for less than 6 months.

Education 
The village has a Hindi medium, co-ed upper primary with secondary school founded in 1954. The schools provide mid-day meal which prepared in school premises as per Indian Midday Meal Scheme and the meal prepared in school premises. As per Right of Children to Free and Compulsory Education Act the school provide free education to children between the ages of 6 and 14.

KC Engineering College and Doaba Khalsa Trust Group Of Institutions are the nearest colleges.

List of schools nearby:
Rayat Institute Of Engineering & Technology, Railmajra
Guru Teg Bahadur Model School, Behram
Sandhu Institute Of Nursing, Mahalon

Transport 

See also 
List of villages in India

References

External links 
 Tourism of Punjab 
 Census of Punjab
 Locality Based PINCode

Villages in Shaheed Bhagat Singh Nagar district